Omiini is a weevil tribe in the subfamily Entiminae.

Genera 
Asphalmus – Baromiamima – Bryodaemon – Chaerocephalus – Desbrochersella – Elytrodon – Gyratogaster – Hlavena – Humeromima – Leianisorhynchus – Microelytrodon – Omiamima – Omias – Rhinomias – Scoliolenus – Teripelus – Urometopus – Yunakovius

References 

 Shuckard, W.E. 1840: The British Coleoptera delineated, consisting of figures of all the genera of British Beetles, drawn in outline by W. Spry, W. Crofts. M. E. S. London: I-VIII + 84 pp. + 94 pl.
 Alonso-Zarazaga, M.A.; Lyal, C.H.C. 1999: A world catalogue of families and genera of Curculionoidea (Insecta: Coleoptera) (excepting Scolytidae and Platypodidae). Entomopraxis, Barcelona.

External links 

Entiminae
Beetle tribes